HMS Gala was a Yarrow type  ordered by the Royal Navy under the 1903 – 1904 Naval Estimates. Named after the Gala Waters in the Scottish Borders area south of Edinburgh, she was the first Royal Navy ship to carry this name. She was launched on 7 January and was accidentally sunk in a collision with the cruiser  on 28 April 1908.

Construction
Gala was laid down on 1 February 1904 at the Yarrow shipyard at Poplar and launched on 7 January 1905.  She was completed in April 1905.  Her original armament was to be the same as the Turtleback torpedo boat destroyers that preceded her.  In 1906 the Admiralty decided to upgrade the armament by landing the five 6-pounder naval guns and shipping three 12-pounder 8 hundredweight (cwt) guns.  Two would be mounted abeam at the foc'x'le break and the third gun would be mounted on the quarterdeck.

Pre-war
After commissioning she was assigned to the East Coast Destroyer Flotilla of the 1st Fleet and based at Harwich.

Loss
A little after midnight all the vessels having their lights masked, Gala  collided with Attentive being struck by the latter's ram in the after part of the engine room and cut in two but only one man was killed. Attentive afterwards collided with the destroyer  and holed her below the waterline. She had to put into Sheerness for repairs. While it was attempted to tow the two parts of Gala to shallow water, it was unsuccessful, with both parts sinking.

References

Bibliography
 
 
 
 
 
 
 

 

River-class destroyers
1905 ships
Ships built on the River Thames
Maritime incidents in 1908
Ships sunk in collisions
Shipwrecks in the North Sea